Pandanus carmichaelii is a species of plant in the family Pandanaceae. It is endemic to Mauritius.

Description
It can be distinguished from many of its closest relatives by its small, round fruit-head (15 cm), which is partially enclosed in protective bracts . The 125-150 drupes in the fruit-head do not protrude from the surface, but are a bit compressed, with flat stigmas, and exposed tips that are flat and angular.

Its leaves are rigid and curved upwards, with abrupt, acute tips.

Habitat
Its natural habitat is swamps. It is threatened by habitat loss and only survives in the high altitude area around Le Petrin.

References

carmichaelii
Endemic flora of Mauritius
Critically endangered plants
Taxonomy articles created by Polbot